Hahm Eun-jung (Known as Eunjung) is a South Korean singer and rapper. Her discography currently consists of 2 extended plays, 11 singles and 6 soundtrack appearances (including live tracks).

Extended plays

Singles

As lead artist

As featured artist

Soundtrack appearances

Other appearances

Notes

References 

Discographies of South Korean artists